Tetraketopiperazine is a chemical compound with a molecule containing a six member heterocyclic ring with two nitrogen atoms. Each carbon is doubly bonded to oxygen.

Production
Reacting sodium oxamate (the sodium salt of oxamic acid) with hydrochloric acid yields some tetraketopiperazine. A higher yield result from reacting ethyl oxalate with sodium ethoxide. Yet another way to make tetraketopiperazine is a condensation of oxamide with ethyl oxalate with sodium ethoxide present.

Excessive nitration of 2,6-diaminopyrazine ends up with tetraketopiperazine.

Reactions
The nitrogen atoms in tetraketopiperazine are slightly acidic losing their hydrogen atoms as ions. Salts of tetraketopiperazine exist. Tetraketopiperazine reacts with sodium bicarbonate to yield a monosodium salt. A disodium salt results from reaction with sodium hydroxide or sodium alkoxide. These are likely to be tautomeric with a hydrogen moving to an oxygen atom. Potassium salts also exist. A monosilver salt can be made from a silver compound and a dissolved tetraketopiperazine potassium salt. Ammonia and mercury salts of tetraketopiperazine also exist.
Tetraketopiperazine also can form a monohydrazone.

Reduction of tetraketopiperazine yields trikeopiperazine and then 2,5-diketopiperazine. Glyoxalic acid and oxamide are side products.

Properties
When heated tetraketopiperazine does not melt, but turns black at 250°C.

Tetraketopiperazine is slightly soluble in water and more so in boiling acetic acid. The solid form has monoclinic prismatic crystals.

pKa is 4.8 and the second pKa2 is 8.2.

References

Piperazines
Imides